Syarikat Perumahan Negara Berhad (SPNB) is a national housing development company owned by the Malaysian Ministry of Finance Incorporated and has been established since 1997. SPNB has been under the purview of Ministry of Housing and Local Government (KPKT) as of 3 August 2018.

History 
1997:

21 August 1997 - Inaugural of SPNB under Ministry of Finance (MOF).

2001:

SPNB was appointed as implementation agent for the rehabilitation of abandoned projects by Ministry of Urban Wellbeing, Housing and Local Government (KPKT). In 2012, SPNB successfully rehabilated 14,951 units of abandoned houses across the nation.

USL was formed (51% owned by SPNB), a joint venture company between SPNB and Armed Forces Fund Board (LTAT). USL is a design and built contractor whom undertook the construction of 6,550 units of army quarters in Klang Valley which were fully completed in 2008.

2002:

SPNB introduced Skim Rumah Keluarga Nelayan Terengganu. This program was designed to assist lower income earners especially fishermen to build house on their own land. Government subsidized 1/3 of the house price to ensure the price is within affordability.

The program was then changed to Rumah Mesra Rakyat (RMR - People Friendly Homes). SPNB has completed more than 40,000 RMR since then.

2004:

Agensi Pengurusan Bencana Negara - NADMA (formerly known as Majlis Keselamatan Negara) appointed SPNB as an implementation agent to provide homes for flood and tsunami victims in Kedah, Penang dan Acheh.

2005:

Program Rumah Mesra Rakyat was expanded to Sabah and Sarawak.

2008:

NADMA appointed SPNB once again to develop houses for the flood victims in Johor, Pahang, Kelantan and Sabah.

2009:

Received an endorsement from SIRIM QAS International Sdn. Bhd. for the implementation of the Quality Management System which complies with ISO 9001: 2008 - Quality Management Systems.

2012:

New design was introduced using IBS (Integrated Building System) and IBS Hybrid System.

Introduced RMR Online System for online application system.

2014:

Rumah Idaman Rakyat was introduced.

SPNB underwent business transformation process whereby new subsidiaries were established meanwhile the existing subsidiaries were strengthened:
 SPNB Aspirasi Sdn. Bhd.
 SPNB Idaman Sdn. Bhd.
 SPNB Mesra Sdn. Bhd.
 SPNB Edar Sdn. Bhd.
 SPNB Dana Sdn. Bhd.
 USL Sdn. Bhd.

2016:

Won The Best Affordable House Developer at the Property Insight Prstigious Developer Award (PIPDA) 2016.

MOU with CIDB to implement Quality Assessment System for Building Construction Works (QLASSIC) assessment system to measure the quality of construction projects.

2017:

SPNB Aspirasi Sdn. Bhd. was awarded with Best High-Rise Development award for Aspire Residence project at the Property Insight Prestigious Developer Award (PIPDA) 2017.

SPNB Mesra Sdb. Bhd. won Best Developer Award 2017 in conjunction with Affordable House Expo 2017 organized by Melaka Housing Board.

Won People Developer Award - Malaysia International Business Award 2017 (MIBA).

SPNB inked MOU with the following partners:
 Ajiya Berhad to use Ajiya Green Integrated Building Solutions ("AGIBS") for the development of housing projects under SPNB Group.
 FELDA for the implementation of 20,000 units RMR-FELDA for 2nd generations FELDA.
 MOU with MNC Wireless as the digital technology solutions partner to support SPNB group's transformation towards digitalization of its business process.

2018:

SPNB has received awards in 2 categories at the Asean Property Awards Malaysia 2018/2019.
 Best Affordable Landed Developer
 Personality Of The Year: YBhg Dato' Sri Hj Mohammad Bin Mentek (SPNB Chairman)

References

External links

1997 establishments in Malaysia
Government-owned companies of Malaysia
Houses in Malaysia
Malaysian companies established in 1997
Minister of Finance (Incorporated) (Malaysia)
Privately held companies of Malaysia